Branko Schmidt (born 21 September 1957) is a Croatian film director. His 2012 film Cannibal Vegetarian was selected as the Croatian entry for the Best Foreign Language Oscar at the 85th Academy Awards, but it did not make the final shortlist.

Filmography
 Sokol Did Not Love Him (Sokol ga nije volio) (1988)
 Đuka Begović (1991)
 Vukovar: The Way Home (Vukovar se vraća kući) (1994)
 Christmas in Vienna (Božić u Beču) (1997)
 The Old Oak Blues (Srce nije u modi) (2000)
 Queen of the Night (Kraljica noći) (2001)
 The Melon Route (Put lubenica) (2006)
 Metastases (Metastaze) (2009)
 Vegetarian Cannibal (Ljudožder vegetarijanac) (2012)
 Ungiven (Imena višnje) (2015)
 Agape (2017)

References

Ljudožder vegetarijanac' je hrvatski kandidat za Oscara HAVC. 14 September 2012. Retrieved 14 September 2012.
Branko Schmidt Shooting Names for the Cherry filmneweurope.com, June 13, 2014.

External links

Croatian film directors
Croatian documentary filmmakers
People from Osijek
Living people
1957 births
Golden Arena winners
Yugoslav film directors
Croatian screenwriters
Golden Arena for Best Director winners